is a Japanese former professional baseball pitcher. He played for the Osaka Kintetsu Buffaloes in 2004, the Orix Buffaloes from 2005 to 2012 and the Yomiuri Giants from 2013 to 2016.

His younger brother Ryoji is also a former professional baseball player.

External links

 NPB.com

1982 births
Living people
Baseball people from Fukuoka Prefecture
Japanese baseball players
Nippon Professional Baseball pitchers
Osaka Kintetsu Buffaloes players
Orix Buffaloes players
Yomiuri Giants players